This is a list of airports in Panama, sorted by location.
International and domestic airports included.



Airports 

Airport names shown in bold indicate the airport has scheduled service on commercial airlines.

Panama City Tocumen airport is the hub, and the busiest airport in all of Central America.

See also 
 Transportation in Panama
 List of airports by ICAO code: M#MP - Panama
 Wikipedia:WikiProject Aviation/Airline destination lists: North America#Panama

References

External links 
Autoridad Aeronautica Civil (Panama Civil Aeronautic Authority)
 

Lists of airports in Panama:
Great Circle Mapper
FallingRain.com
Aircraft Charter World
The Airport Guide
World Aero Data

 
Panama
Airports in Panama
Airports
Panama